Kapera is a settlement in Võru Parish, Võru County in southeastern Estonia.

Cyclist Aavo Pikkuus was born in Kapera in 1954.

References

Villages in Võru County